Albert Park was an electoral district of the House of Assembly in the Australian state of South Australia from 1970 to 1993.

The suburb of Albert Park is currently located in the safe Labor seat of Cheltenham.

Members

Election results

References

External links
1985 & 1989 election boundaries, page 18 & 19

Former electoral districts of South Australia
1970 establishments in Australia
1993 disestablishments in Australia
Constituencies established in 1970
Constituencies disestablished in 1993